Irina is a 2018 Bulgarian drama film directed by Nadejda Koseva.

plot
Irina is a part-time waitress in a small Bulgarian town. On the same day when she is fired, her husband gets into a serious accident. Irina's family is trapped in poverty. To make ends meet, she becomes a surrogate mother. Conflict, despair, and Irina being with child brings on another wave of challenges to Irina's already rough situation. Slowly, Irina discovers what it means to love and to forgive.

Cast
Irina MARTINA APOSTOLOVA
Sasho HRISTO USHEV
Lyudmila KASIEL NOAH ASHER
Eva IRINI JAMBONAS
Bozhidar ALEXANDER KOSSEV
Varlaam KRASSIMIR DOKOV
Gynecologist IVAN SAVOV
Waitress KATERINA KEREMEDCHIEVA
The Boss NIKOLAY TODOROV
Hospital Attendant ANA VALCHANOVA

Reception
2018: Fajr International Film Festival, Winner Silver Simorgh for Best Actress (Martina Apostolova) 
2018: Warsaw International Film Festival, Winner of the Ecumenical Jury Award, Winner of the Special Jury Award for Martina Apostolova (actor), Nominee for Grand Prix, In-Competition section, Poland
2018: Tirana International Film Festival, Winner of the Golden Owl Award for the Best Feature Film, Albania
2018: Minsk International Film Festival, Nominee for Grand Prix for the Best Film, Belarus
2018: Golden Rose Bulgarian Feature Film Festival, Winner of the Award of the Union of Bulgarian Filmmakers for the Best Director. Winner of the Golden Rose Award for the Best First Feature, Winner of the Golden Rose Award for the Best Actress (Martina Apostolova), Nominee for Golden Rose Award for Best Feature film
2018: Cottbus Film Festival of Young East European Cinema, Winner of the Best Debut Film, Winner of the Award for Outstanding Actress (Martina Apostolova), Nominee for the Main Prize for Best Film

References

External links
 
 Official website